William Roy Sharp Drummond (18 October 1890–15 December 1966), known as 'Roy', was an Australian rules footballer for the Port Adelaide Football Club.

Family
The son of Andrew Drummond (1849–1926), and Nancy Jane Drummond (1853–1919), née Brookes, William Roy Sharp Drummond was born at Semaphore, South Australia on 18 October 1890.

He married Edith May Williams (1892–1949) on 18 August 1919.

He is the grandfather of Olympic basketballer Phil Smyth.

Military Medal
William Drummond was awarded a Military Medal during World War I. He was awarded the medal for, as records state, taking '"control of his platoon (in battle at Hamel near Amiens on 7 July 1918) after almost all other non-commissioned officers were killed. He reorganised the platoon and led them to their objective that night. He also assisted with the wounded that night and showed great coolness and initiative throughout the operation."'

Post Football 
After returning from war William would spend time fishing off the Semaphore Jetty trying to catch fish to feed families struggling to obtain food.

Death
He died at Largs Bay, South Australia on 15 December 1966.

See also
 1916 Pioneer Exhibition Game

Notes

References
 Rucci, M., "Port Adelaide uncovers story of premiership winner who became military hero", The (Adelaide) Advertiser, Thursday, 24 April 2014.
 First World War Embarkation Roll: Private William Roy Sharp Drummond (277), collection of the Australian War Memorial.
 First World War Nominal Roll: Lance-Sergeant William Roy Drummond "MM" (277), collection of the Australian War Memorial.
 Recommendation for Award of Military Medal, collection of the Australian War Memorial.
 Military Medal: 4th Military District: "No.277, Lance-Corporal W.R.S. Drumond, 43rd Battalion", Commonwealth of Australia Gazette, no.23, (Wednesday, 12 February 1919), p.272.
 First World War Service Record: Lance-Sergeant William Roy Sharp Drummond (277), National Archives of Australia.

Australian rules footballers from South Australia
Port Adelaide Football Club (SANFL) players
Port Adelaide Football Club players (all competitions)
Australian recipients of the Military Medal
Australian military personnel of World War I
1890 births
1966 deaths